Patagoniodes farinaria, the blue stem borer, is a moth of the family Pyralidae. It is found in New Zealand and Australia.

It is a shoot borer that feeds on Senecio jacobaea, Senecio species and closely related plants.

References

External links
 Wikimedia Commons: Patagoniodes farinaria

Moths of New Zealand
Moths of Australia